Elina Svitolina was the two-time defending champion, but chose not to participate this year.

Margarita Gasparyan won her first WTA title, defeating Patricia Maria Țig in the final, 6–3, 5–7, 6–0.

Seeds

Draw

Finals

Top half

Bottom half

Qualifying

Seeds

Qualifiers

Lucky loser
  Yuliya Beygelzimer

Draw

First qualifier

Second qualifier

Third qualifier

Fourth qualifier

Fifth qualifier

Sixth qualifier

References

 Main Draw
 Qualifying Draw

Baku Cup - Singles
2015 Singles